Oncheon or Onchŏn may refer to:
 Onchon County, Nampo City, South Pyongan Province, North Korea
 Oncheon-dong, neighbourhood (dong) of Dongnae District, Busan, South Korea
 Oncheon-cheon, stream in Busan, South Korea
 the Korean word for "hot spring", similar to Onsen in Japanese